Scouting in China may refer to:

Scouting and Guiding in mainland China
Scouting and Guiding in Hong Kong
Scouting and Guiding in Macao
Scouting in the Republic of China
Boy Scouts of Manchukuo